Hakan Erşeker (born 5 July 1994) is a Qatari boxer. He competed in the men's lightweight competition at the 2016 Summer Olympics.

References

External links 
 
 
 
 

1994 births
Living people
Qatari male boxers
Olympic boxers of Qatar
Boxers at the 2016 Summer Olympics
Place of birth missing (living people)
Boxers at the 2018 Asian Games
Asian Games competitors for Qatar
Lightweight boxers